The National Telecommunications act in the second period of Estonian independence granted a monopoly on international and local fixed line telephony to Estonian Telecom (Eesti Telecom).  In the process of privatization, a concession was granted to liberalize mobile, CATV and packet-switched telecommunications.  This concession was critical for developing a competitive market. Three licensed mobile operators encouraged one of the highest rates of mobile telephony penetration in the world.  CATV licenses were granted at a local level, and while it was a more natural monopoly, pirate operators proliferated within populous cities in the 1990s.  

Internet penetration blossomed. Beginning with a satellite link and widespread undersea leased line connectivity, Estonia connected with the rest of the world. The concession for packet communications, perhaps against the constraint of limited international telephony competition (with the global exceptions of callback, transit and re-file arbitrage) -- created conditions in which Skype was natively created.

With a population of about 1.3 million, Estonia had in 2012 about 2.07 million cellular telephones and 0.45 million fixed phones. In 2009 it had about 0.97 million internet users.

See also
 Internet in Estonia

References 
 CIA World Factbook